A Cup of Kindness may refer to:

 A Cup of Kindness (play), a 1929 stage farce by Ben Travers
 A Cup of Kindness (film), a 1934 film version of the above, directed by Tom Walls